A nutcracker is a tool for cracking nuts.

Nutcracker or The Nutcracker may also refer to:

Arts, entertainment, and media
 "The Nutcracker and the Mouse King", an 1816 story by E.T.A. Hoffmann
 List of productions of The Nutcracker, other versions and revisions of Hoffman's story
 The Nutcracker (Histoire d'un casse-noisette, 1844): a revision of Hoffman's story by Alexandre Dumas
 The Nutcracker, an 1892 ballet by Tchaikovsky
 The Nutcracker (Willam Christensen), a 1944 version of the ballet
 The Nutcracker (Balanchine), a 1954 stage production of the ballet
 The Nutcracker, International Television Contest for Young Musicians, a Russian annual music competition
 The Nut Cracker, a 1920 novel by Frederic S. Isham

Films
 The Nutcracker (1926 film), a 1926 American silent film directed by Lloyd Ingraham
 The Nutcracker (1967 film), a 1967 Polish film directed by Halina Bielińska
 The Nutcracker (1973 film), a 1973 Soviet animation directed by Boris Stepantsev
 Nutcracker (film), a 1982 British drama film
 Pacific Northwest Ballet's Nutcraker, a 1986 film directed by Carroll Ballard
 The Nutcracker Prince, a 1990 Canadian-American animated film.
 The Nutcracker (1993 film), a 1993 American Christmas musical directed by Emile Ardolino
 The Nutcracker in 3D (released on DVD as The Nutcracker: The Untold Story), a 2009 British-Hungarian 3D film 
 The Nutcracker and the Four Realms, a 2018 American film

Computing
 Nutcracker (Excelan), a networking analyzer by Excelan
 NuTCRACKER, a software suite that included the MKS Toolkit

Other uses 
 Nutcracker (bird), a genus of birds
 Nutcracker, a tow gripper needed on some ski tows
 Nutcracker doll, a German decorative figurine
 Nutcracker (drink), a type of alcoholic drink illicitly sold in New York City
 Nutcracker syndrome, a medical condition involving a crushed vein